Group C of UEFA Euro 2020 took place from 13 to 21 June 2021 in Amsterdam's Johan Cruyff Arena and Bucharest's Arena Națională. The group contained host nation the Netherlands, Ukraine, Austria and North Macedonia.

Teams

Notes

Standings

In the round of 16,
The winner of Group C, the Netherlands, advanced to play the third-placed team of Group D, the Czech Republic.
The runner-up of Group C, Austria, advanced to play the winner of Group A, Italy.
The third-placed team of Group C, Ukraine, advanced as one of the four best third-placed teams to play the winner of Group E, Sweden.

Matches

Austria vs North Macedonia

Netherlands vs Ukraine

Ukraine vs North Macedonia

Netherlands vs Austria

North Macedonia vs Netherlands

Ukraine vs Austria

Discipline
Fair play points were to be used as a tiebreaker if the head-to-head and overall records of teams were tied (and if a penalty shoot-out was not applicable as a tiebreaker). These were calculated based on yellow and red cards received in all group matches as follows:
yellow card = 1 point
red card as a result of two yellow cards = 3 points
direct red card = 3 points
yellow card followed by direct red card = 4 points

Only one of the above deductions was applied to a player in a single match.

References

External links

Group C overview at UEFA.com

UEFA Euro 2020
Netherlands at UEFA Euro 2020
Ukraine at UEFA Euro 2020
Austria at UEFA Euro 2020
North Macedonia at UEFA Euro 2020
June 2021 sports events in the Netherlands
2021 in Romanian sport